The 2005 Arab Futsal Championship took place in Cairo, Egypt from 19 July to 24 July 2005.

Group stage

Group 1

Matches

Group 2

Matches

Semifinals

3rd Place

Final

Honors

Sources
Futsal Planet
RSSF

2005
2005
2005 in futsal
Arab
2005 in African football